The sabre saw (also saber saw) is a hand-held powered reciprocating saw. It is  a jigsaw.

The sabre saw uses a toothed blade, chiefly to cut through wood and other soft materials.

References

Woodworking hand-held power tools
Saws